Chocolate News is an American satirical news show hosted and head written by David Alan Grier in 2008 with an emphasis on African American culture. The show was broadcast on Wednesday nights at 10:30 pm on Comedy Central as a lead-in to its other news satire programs, The Daily Show with Jon Stewart and The Colbert Report. The show was also shown in Canada on The Comedy Network. On 10 March 2009, a Comedy Central representative confirmed that Chocolate News would not be renewed for a second season.

Format
Chocolate News comprised satirical pieces and sketches about current events and news stories. The show satirized these stories with a focus on how Grier thinks typical African Americans view them. In an interview with the New York Times, Grier asked, "Are you laughing with me because you get the joke, or am I giving you license to laugh at me in a derogatory, dehumanizing way?" When the series was first pitched to studio executives at NBC, they were initially reluctant to produce and develop a pilot for the show due to the negative racial connotations associated with the term "Chocolate"; it was only with the intervention of actors Martin Sheen and  William Shatner that the studio decided to proceed with the pilot and eventually to commission the show.
Sketches were directed by Rusty Cundieff, who directed most of the sketches on Dave Chappelle's Chappelle's Show.

Episodes
Episode 1: first broadcast 15 October 2008
Episode 2: first broadcast 22 October 2008
Episode 3: first broadcast 29 October 2008
Episode 4: first broadcast 5 November 2008
Episode 5: first broadcast 12 November 2008
Episode 6: first broadcast 19 November 2008
Episode 7: first broadcast 26 November 2008
Episode 8: first broadcast 3 December 2008
Episode 9: first broadcast 10 December 2008
Episode 10: first broadcast 17 December 2008

Cast
David Alan Grier
Tangie Ambrose - Alicia Sanders
Alphonso McAuley - Ronnie Tucker
Chris Tallman - Alan Boda
Jordan Peele - Kelvin Melvin

References

External links
 
Official website
"Does "Salon" Think Black People Don't Read It?", Palm Beach Post, 15 October 2008
"'Chocolate News' is edgy, but can it be funny?", Boston.com, 15 October 2008
"As Election Nears, a Black Voice Enters Comedy Fray", New York Times, 15 October 2008

2000s American black television series
2000s American late-night television series
2000s American satirical television series
2000s American sketch comedy television series
2000s American television news shows
2008 American television series debuts
2008 American television series endings
American news parodies
Comedy Central late-night programming
Comedy Central original programming